(Tai-chow dialect: Wông-ngæn K'ü) is a district of Taizhou, a city in Zhejiang Province, China.

History
In 1989, Huangyan County was upgraded to a county-level city. As of 1990 census, the population of Huangyuan City was 888,631.

In 1994, Taizhou City was upgraded to a prefecture-level city, correspondingly  Huangyan City was amalgamated in Taizhou City, and divided into two districts as Huangyan and Luqiao.

Administrative divisions
Subdistricts:
Dongcheng Subdistrict (东城街道), Xicheng Subdistrict (西城街道), Nancheng Subdistrict (南城街道), Beicheng Subdistrict (北城街道), Chengjiang Subdistrict (澄江街道), Xinqian Subdistrict (新前街道), Jiangkou Subdistrict (江口街道), Gaoqiao, Taizhou (高桥街道)

Towns:
Ningxi (宁溪镇), Beiyang (北洋镇), Toutuo (头陀镇), Yuanqiao (院桥镇), Shabu (沙埠镇)

Townships:
Fushan Township (富山乡), Shangzheng Township (上郑乡), Yutou Township (屿头乡), Shangyang Township (上垟乡), Maoshe Township (茅畲乡), Pingtian Township (平田乡)

Features of Huangyan

China orange town 
Huangyan is a fruitful place especially for the Mandarin Oranges with long history. Many kinds of worldwide oranges are originated from Huangyan. Now it is the most important mandarin orange planting place in china, exporting to worldwide largely annually.

China mould town
Huangyan is a famous plastic mould manufacturing base in China. With seven series of precision mould tooling ability including automobile, motorcycle, electric bike, home appliances, audio & video, pipe fitting, medical, chemical. According to the stat. in 2006, in the domestic market, 70% of plastic moulds were made in Huangyan, 50% TV manufacturers choose to purchase TV mould from Huangyan, 70% electric bike plastic parts were made in Huangyan, most of auto manufacturers including FAW, Geely, Dongfeng, Shanghai Volkswagen ordered mould in Huangyan, most home appliance manufactures e.g. Haier, Konka, Changhong, Hisense, Royalstar, Xoceco etc. use the mould from Huangyan. Huangyan has become the important mould tooling center in China, and growing rapidly to export to the oversea market.

References

External links
  Official site

Districts of Zhejiang
Taizhou, Zhejiang